Gesta may refer to:

Titles of works
Gesta is the Latin word for "deeds" or "acts", and Latin titles, especially of medieval chronicles, frequently begin with the word, which thus is also a generic term for medieval biographies:
Gesta Adalberonis or Gesta Alberonis, "Deeds of Albero", Archbishop of Trier (1131–52)
Gesta Berengarii imperatoris, "Deeds of the Emperor Berengar", epic poem chronicling the career of Berengar of Friuli from c.874 to 915
Gesta comitum Barcinonensium et regum Aragoniae, "Deeds of the counts of Barcelona and kings of Aragon", 14th century
Gesta Cnutonis Regis or Encomium Emmae Reginae, "Deeds of King Canute" 11th-century, also covers Queen Emma of Normandy
Gesta Danorum, "Deeds of the Danes", 12th century
Dei gesta per Francos, "Deeds of God through the Franks", 12th century, a narrative of the First Crusade
Gesta Francorum, "The Deeds of the Franks", in full Gesta Francorum et aliorum Hierosolimitanorum ("The deeds of the Franks and the other pilgrims to Jerusalem"), 12th century, a different narrative of the First Crusade
Gesta Guillelmi or Gesta Willelmi ducis Normannorum et regis Anglorum, "Deeds of William Duke of Normandy and King of England" (William the Conqueror), 11th century
Gesta Hammaburgensis ecclesiae pontificum, "Deeds of Bishops of the Hamburg Church", 11th century
Gesta Herewardi, "Deeds of Hereward the Wake", 12th century
Gesta Hungarorum, "Deeds of the Hungarians", 12th century
Gesta Hunnorum et Hungarorum, "Deeds of the Huns and Hungarians", 13th century
Gesta Hludowici Imperatoris, "Deeds of Emperor Louis", 9th century life of the Holy Roman Emperor Louis the Pious.
Gesta Normannorum Ducum, "Deeds of the Dukes of Normandy", 11th century, extended in 12th.
Gesta principum Polonorum, "Deeds of the Princes of the Poles", 12th century
Gesta pontificum Anglorum, "Deeds of the English Bishops", 12th century
Gesta Romanorum, "Deeds of the Romans", a collection of anecdotes and tales, c. 1300, created somewhere in northern Europe
Gesta Regum Anglorum, "Deeds of the kings of the English", c. 1125
Gesta Regum Britanniae, "Deeds of the Kings of Britain", poem c. 1240s
Gesta regum Francorum, "Deeds of the Kings of the French", c. 727, more often called the Liber Historiae Francorum
Gesta Roberti Wiscardi, "The Deeds of Robert Guiscard", 1090s, poem
Gesta Roderici Campi Docti, "Deeds of Rodrigo el Campeador" (El Cid), 12th century
Gesta Rogeri (Deeds of Roger), covers the reign of Roger II of Sicily 1127–1135, written by Alexander of Telese
Gesta Stephani, "Deeds of King Stephen" of England, mid-12th-century
Gesta Tancredi in expeditione Hierosolymitana, "The Deeds of Tancred in the Expedition to Jerusalem" (First Crusade), early 12th century
Gesta Treverorum, "Deeds of the people of Trier", a collection of histories, legends, wars, & records of the Archbishops of Trier, compiled 12th century to 1794

Other
Gesta (butterfly), a genus of skipper butterfly
Gesta (journal), an academic journal on medieval history published by The University of Chicago Press on behalf of the International Center of Medieval Art
Cantar de gesta and chanson de geste, both meaning "song of deeds", is a term for medieval Spanish and French poems on heroic themes